The Albacore-class gunboat was a class of three gunboats built for the Royal Navy in 1883. The name had already been used for a class of 98 gunboats built during the Great Armament of the Crimean War.

Design
The Albacore class was designed by Nathaniel Barnaby, the Admiralty Director of Naval Construction. The ships were of composite construction, meaning that the iron keel, frames, stem and stern posts were of iron, while the hull was planked with timber. This had the advantage of allowing the vessels to be coppered, thus keeping marine growth under control, a problem that caused iron-hulled ships to be frequently docked. They pioneered the use of modern breech-loading guns as the main armament, but were the last gunboats to mount their weapons on traversing mountings.

Propulsion

Armament
Ships of the class were armed with two 5-inch/50-pdr (38cwt) breech-loading guns and two 4-inch/20-pdr breech-loading guns. A pair of machine guns was also fitted.

Ships

Notes

References

 
 
 

Gunboat classes
Gunboats of the Royal Navy
Victorian-era gunboats of the United Kingdom